The Citizen's Popular Rally was a political party in Burkina Faso. In the 2007 parliamentary elections the party won one of the 111 seats in the National Assembly

Defunct political parties in Burkina Faso